The N.J. Taylor Trophy is a Canadian Football League trophy, formerly awarded to the West Division champions. The winner of this trophy faced the winner of the James S. Dixon Trophy for the Grey Cup. Both the N. J. Taylor Trophy and James S. Dixon Trophy were retired in 2004.

The N.J. Taylor Trophy was named after former Western Inter-Provincial Football Union president N. J. "Piffles" Taylor. The trophy was first awarded in 1948, replacing the earlier Hugo Ross Trophy which served an identical function.

In 1995, as part of the failed American expansion, the Taylor Trophy was awarded to the champions of the Northern Division.

N.J. Taylor Trophy winners
 Bold text represents the eventual Grey Cup champions.

 2003 - Edmonton Eskimos
 2002 - Edmonton Eskimos
 2001 - Calgary Stampeders
 2000 - BC Lions
 1999 - Calgary Stampeders
 1998 - Calgary Stampeders
 1997 - Saskatchewan Roughriders
 1996 - Edmonton Eskimos
 1995 - Calgary Stampeders
 1994 - BC Lions
 1993 - Edmonton Eskimos
 1992 - Calgary Stampeders
 1991 - Calgary Stampeders
 1990 - Edmonton Eskimos
 1989 - Saskatchewan Roughriders
 1988 - BC Lions
 1987 - Edmonton Eskimos
 1986 - Edmonton Eskimos
 1985 - BC Lions
 1984 - Winnipeg Blue Bombers
 1983 - BC Lions
 1982 - Edmonton Eskimos
 1981 - Edmonton Eskimos
 1980 - Edmonton Eskimos
 1979 - Edmonton Eskimos
 1978 - Edmonton Eskimos
 1977 - Edmonton Eskimos
 1976 - Saskatchewan Roughriders
 1975 - Edmonton Eskimos
 1974 - Edmonton Eskimos
 1973 - Edmonton Eskimos
 1972 - Saskatchewan Roughriders
 1971 - Calgary Stampeders
 1970 - Calgary Stampeders
 1969 - Saskatchewan Roughriders
 1968 - Calgary Stampeders
 1967 - Saskatchewan Roughriders
 1966 - Saskatchewan Roughriders
 1965 - Winnipeg Blue Bombers
 1964 - BC Lions
 1963 - BC Lions
 1962 - Winnipeg Blue Bombers
 1961 - Winnipeg Blue Bombers
 1960 - Edmonton Eskimos
 1959 - Winnipeg Blue Bombers
 1958 - Winnipeg Blue Bombers
 1957 - Winnipeg Blue Bombers
 1956 - Edmonton Eskimos
 1955 - Edmonton Eskimos
 1954 - Edmonton Eskimos
 1953 - Winnipeg Blue Bombers
 1952 - Edmonton Eskimos
 1951 - Saskatchewan Roughriders
 1950 - Winnipeg Blue Bombers
 1949 - Calgary Stampeders
 1948 - Calgary Stampeders

References

Defunct Canadian Football League trophies and awards